Pascal Lamy (born 8 April 1947) is a French political consultant and businessman. He was the Director-General of the World Trade Organization (WTO) from 1 September 2005 to 1 September 2013 for 8 years. In April 2009, WTO members reappointed Lamy for a second 4-year term, beginning on 1 September 2009. He was then succeeded by Roberto Azevêdo. Pascal Lamy was also European Commissioner for Trade for 5 years, from 13 September 1999 to 22 November 2004 and is an advisor for the transatlantic think-tank European Horizons, as well as currently serving as the Honorary President of the Paris-based think tank, Notre Europe.

Early life
Born in Levallois-Perret, Hauts-de-Seine, a suburb of Paris, Lamy studied at Sciences Po Paris, from HEC and ÉNA, graduating second in his year of those specialising in economics.

He then joined the civil service, and in this role he ended up serving as an adviser to Jacques Delors as Economics and Finance Minister and Pierre Mauroy as Prime Minister.

Lamy has been a member of the French Socialist Party since 1969.

Career

Member of the European Commission
In 1979 Pascal Lamy was appointed to the post of Secretary General of the "Mayoux Committee". During 1979-1981 he worked as Deputy Secretary General, then Secretary General of the Interministerial Committee for the Remodelling of Industrial Structures (CIASI) in the Treasury Department. In 1981 Pascal Lamy was technical Adviser, then Deputy Director (June 1982), Office of the Ministers for Economic and Financial Affairs (Mr Jacques Delors).

Lamy became Deputy Secretary General, then Secretary General of the Interministerial Committee for the Remodelling of Industrial Structures (CIASI) in the Treasury Department. When Delors became President of the European Commission in 1984, he took Lamy with him to serve as chef de cabinet, which he did until the end of Delors' term in 1994. During his time there, Lamy became known as the Beast of the Berlaymont, the Gendarme and Exocet due to his habit of ordering civil servants, even Directors-General (heads of department) "precisely what to do – or else." He was seen as ruling Delors' office with a "rod of iron", with no-one able to bypass or manipulate him and those who tried being "banished to one of the less pleasant European postings".

Lamy briefly moved into business at Crédit Lyonnais. Promoted to second in command, he was involved in the restructuring and privatisation of the bank.

Returning to the European Commission in 1999, Lamy was appointed European Commissioner for Trade by Commission President Romano Prodi. Lamy served to the expiry of the commission's term in 2004. His ability to manage the powerful civil servants in his department was noted. During his time in office, he pushed for a new Doha round of world trade talks and advocated reform within the WTO.

Director-General of the WTO, 2005–2013
On 13 May 2005, Lamy was chosen as the next director-general of the World Trade Organization, and took office on 1 September 2005 for a four-year term. He had been nominated by the European Union and won over candidates including Carlos Pérez del Castillo of Uruguay and Jaya Krishna Cuttaree of Mauritius.

On 30 April 2009, Lamy was re-elected unanimously by the WTO General Council for a second term of four years, beginning 1 September 2009. He also served as the chairman of the organization's Trade Negotiations Committee. He was the WTO's fifth director-general.

Also in 2009, Lamy served on the High Level Commission on the Modernization of World Bank Group Governance, which – under the leadership of Ernesto Zedillo – conducted an external review of the World Bank Group's governance.

Later career
Since 2019, Lamy has been serving as President of the Paris Peace Forum. Pascal Lamy is a member of the advisory board of the Prague European Summit.

Other activities

Corporate boards
 Danone, Member of the Mission Committee (since 2020)
 Bosch, Member of the International Advisory Committee (since 2015)

Non-profit organizations
 Africa Europe Foundation (AEF), Member of the High-Level Group of Personalities on Africa-Europe Relations (since 2020)
 Berggruen Institute, Member of the Council for the Future of Europe
 Broader European Leadership Agenda (BELA), Member of the Advisory Board
 Center for Economic and Policy Research (CEPR), Distinguished Fellow (since 2019)
 Centre for European Reform (CER), Member of the Advisory Board
 European Climate Foundation, Member of the Supervisory Board
 Europaeum, Member of the Board of Trustees
 European Council on Foreign Relations (ECFR), Member
 European Horizons, Advisor
 Fondation européenne d'études progressistes (FEPS), Vice-President of the Bureau
 French Institute for International and Strategic Affairs (IRIS]), Honorary President of the Board of Directors
 Graduate Institute of International and Development Studies of Geneva, distinguished senior fellow. 
 Jacques Delors Centre at Hertie School, Member of the Advisory Board
 Mo Ibrahim Foundation, Member of the Board
 Les Musiciens du Louvre, President of the Board of Directors
 Women Political Leaders Global Forum (WPL), Member of the Global Advisory Board
 Transparency International, Member of the Advisory Council
 UNAIDS–Lancet Commission on Defeating AIDS, Member (2013-2015)

Personal life
Lamy is married and has three sons. His hobbies include running and cycling.

Select publications
Lamy, Pascal. The Geneva Consensus: Making Trade Work for All. Cambridge: Cambridge University Press, 2013.
Lamy, Pascal. The Economic Summit and the European Community. Bissell Paper No. 5. Toronto: University of Toronto, Centre for International Studies, 1988

Lectures
The Relationship between WTO Law and General International Law in the Lecture Series of the United Nations Audiovisual Library of International Law

References

External links

 About Pascal Lamy
 Pascal Lamy's Commissioner's profile
 Notre Europe
 "Pascal Lamy – Managing Global Expectations", The Globalist, 23 February 2006
 Pascal Lamy: Free Trade and Interdependence Help Promote Freedom – video report by Democracy Now!

|-

|-

1947 births
École nationale d'administration alumni
Lycée Carnot alumni
HEC Paris alumni
Sciences Po alumni
Knights Commander of the Order of Merit of the Federal Republic of Germany
Grand Officiers of the Légion d'honneur
Grand Officers of the Ordre national du Mérite
Knights Grand Cross of the Order of Merit of the Italian Republic
Officers of the Order of Merit of the Grand Duchy of Luxembourg
Living people
People from Levallois-Perret
Socialist Party (France) politicians
French economists
French bankers
French European Commissioners
Directors-General of the World Trade Organization
Academic staff of Sciences Po